Ovamboland, or Ovambo, was a Bantustan or "homeland" in South West Africa set aside for the Ovambo people during the apartheid period.

Leaders 
(Dates in italics indicate de facto continuation of office.)

Political affiliation
CDA - Christian Democratic Action for Social Justice

See also
Namibia
Ovambo people
Bantustans in South West Africa
Apartheid
Presidents of Namibia
Prime Ministers of Namibia
Democratic Co-operative Party

External links
World Statesmen – Namibia Homelands

Apartheid in South West Africa
Bantustans in South West Africa
Ovamboland